Edward Arthur Burroughs (1 October 1882 – 23 August 1934) was an English writer and Anglican bishop.

Born into an ecclesiastical family — his father was William Edward Burroughs (1845–1931), rector of the Mariners' Church, Dún Laoghaire and later prebendary of Exeter Cathedral — and educated at Harrow School and Balliol College, Oxford, he was ordained in 1908. He was Fellow, Lecturer and Tutor at Hertford College, Oxford and an Honorary Chaplain to the King before being appointed Dean of Bristol in 1922. Four year later he was ordained to the episcopate as Bishop of Ripon. At the opening ceremony  of the Hostel of the Resurrection in Leeds in 1928 Burroughs caused controversy when he described modern universities such as Leeds as "counterfeit presentations" when compared to the "real thing(s)" of Oxford and Cambridge. His comments denounced by others at the ceremony, Burroughs was forced to withdraw his words in a statement to the press the following week.

He died on 23 August 1934.

References

1882 births
1934 deaths
20th-century Church of England bishops
Alumni of Balliol College, Oxford
Bishops of Ripon (modern diocese)
Deans of Bristol
English writers
Fellows of Hertford College, Oxford
Honorary Chaplains to the King
People educated at Harrow School